The Laguna State Polytechnic University (LSPU) is a state university in the Province of Laguna, Philippines, with four regular campuses and several auxiliary sites. It is currently classified as SUC Level III (CHED Memorandum Order 12, series of 2018).

Historical Development 
This state institution (LSPU) started from its humble beginnings in 1952. It was first established as a provincial high school known as Baybay Provincial High School, the first public high school based in the shoreline (baybay) district of Laguna de Bay, and the second in the whole Province of Laguna. Then in 1957, by virtue of Republic Act No. 1807 on June 1957, the Baybay Provincial High School was converted into Baybay National Agricultural and Vocational School (BNAVS).

BNAVS became the PACD-BVE Training Center in rice production for American Peace Corps Volunteers. This center produced 682 graduates. The Manpower Training Center Started to operate in the school year 1968-1969. BNAVS also became the pilot school for the 2-year Agricultural Technician Curriculum, Associate in Agriculture. This started in December 1969 with eight enrollees.

With the passage/approval of HB 269 into law in June 1971: Republic Act No. 6321, it converted BNAVS into Baybay National College of Agriculture and Technology (BNCAT). BNCAT then was offering the following courses:

1) Secondary Agriculture Curriculum;

2) Two-year Associate in Agriculture (technical course);

3) degree courses leading to Bachelor of Science in Agriculture (2nd Semester 1975-76) and Bachelor of Science in Agricultural Education (First Semester 1977-78).

The College was also one of the Experimental Agricultural High Schools (EAHS) selected by the Educational Development Projects Implementing Task Force (EDPITAF) under Presidential Decree No. 6-A to receive World Bank Aid in infrastructure equipment and staff development.

This state institution was a grantee of the Agricultural Education Outreach Project (AEOP) from 1980 to 1983. AEOP was a research project of the United States Agency for International Development (USAID). Research programs became more prioritized, and government extension programs became more aggressive.

On June 11, 1984, by virtue of Batas Pambansa No. 482, BNCAT was further converted into a state college, known as the Laguna State Polytechnic College. From then on, the Laguna State Polytechnic College grew more extensive and better with the incumbency of Dr. Ricardo A. Wagan as the first College President in 1986, several projects and infrastructure developments poured into LSPC. Among the remarkable accomplishments then were as follows:

 In 1993, this state institution was designated by the Department of Education, Culture and Sports (DECS) as one of the     seven Provincial Technical Institutes of Agriculture (PTIAs) in Region IV under the Aus-AID-AGRITECH Project aimed at improving the curriculum, instructional programs and the development of practical and applied     researches.
 It opened four satellite campuses through Memoranda of Agreements with the local governments;
 and It integrated the following three CHED-Supervised Institutions under the Special Provision No. 2 of the CHED FY 1999 Budget under the General Appropriations Act of 1999 or Republic Act No. 8745 and Republic Act No. 8292 Higher Education Modernization Act of 1997, through the issuance of the following: CHED Memorandum No. 18, s.     1999 entitled Issuance of the Implementing Guidelines on the Integration     of CHED-Supervised Institutions (CSIs) to State Universities and Colleges (SUCs). This integration formally took place on October 5 and 25, 1999, respectively, to wit: Laguna College of Arts and Trades now LSPU-Sta. Cruz Campus located at Barangay Bubukal, Sta. Cruz, Laguna Los Baños College of Fisheries now LSPU-Los Baños Campus located at Barangays Malinta, Los Baños, Laguna CHED Memorandum Order No. 27, s. 2000 Issuance of Implementing Guidelines of the Integration of CHED-Supervised Institutions     (CSIs) to State Universities and Colleges (SUCs) (Phase II).

The formal turn-over ceremony took place on December 11, 2000, to wit: San Pablo City National School of Arts and Trades, now LSPU-San Pablo City Campus, located at Barangay Del Remedio, San Pablo City. His incumbency is marked by a list of distinctive accomplishment such as the establishment of a multi-campus State Institution; a remarkable increase in the number of non-degree and degree curricular programs/offerings, which resulted in increased enrolment and need for more teachers; exempted Secondary School Teachers to be transferred to DECS per CHED-DECS joint circular, intensified rehabilitation, repair, face-lifting of old structures and construction of new academic, research, library, dormitory, canteen-cafeteria, sports and recreation facilities; opened the Graduate Studies and Applied Research in its four Campuses; acquired state of the art equipment, e.g., Speech Lab., computers, Physics, Chemistry, and Biology Laboratory equipment, the Tissue Culture Laboratory.

Campuses 
Siniloan Campus

Four regular campuses belong to the university. The campus in Siniloan was founded in 1952 (as Baybay National High School), where the university traces its roots. It concentrates on Agriculture and Computer Studies.

Santa Cruz Campus

The main campus is situated in the provincial capital town, Santa Cruz. Founded in 1957, initial operations began three years after, in 1960. It occupies  of land at Barangay Bubukal. It concentrates on Engineering, Nursing and Allied Health, Hospitality Management and Tourism, Arts and Sciences, Business Management and Accountancy, Criminal Justice Education, and Law.

San Pablo City Campus

The San Pablo City Campus located at Barangay Del Remedio was founded in 1957 and began operations in 1960. With  of land, it is a "Center of Development" in Teacher Education (CHED Memorandum Order 17, series of 2016) and also concentrates on Industrial Technology.

Los Baños Campus

LSPU Los Baños Campus was founded in 1957 and started operations in 1959.

Auxiliary sites

There are also two satellite campuses in Nagcarlan, Laguna, and in Lopez, Quezon, a manpower extension campus in Magdalena, Laguna, and two International Language Studies Centers in Thai Nguyen University, Vietnam, and Changwon Moonsung University, South Korea.

Governance and organization

Board of Regents
The University's governance is vested in the Board of Regents (or Lupon ng mga Rehente), commonly abbreviated as BOR. The board, with its ten members, is the highest decision-making body of the LSPU System.

The chairperson of the Commission on Higher Education (CHED) serves as the board's chairperson, while the president of the Laguna State Polytechnic University is the vice-chairperson. The chairpersons of the Committees of Higher Education of the Senate and the House of Representatives are also members, concurrent with their functions as committee chairpersons.

The regional directors of the Department of Science and Technology (DOST) and the National Economic and Development Authority (NEDA), Region IV-A Calabarzon, also serve as regular members.

The LSPU students, represented by the Federated Supreme Student Council (FSSC), nominate a Student Regent. While a Faculty Regent is likewise appointed by the faculty members of the whole University through the LSPU Faculty Association (LSPU FA). Alumni are represented by the President of the LSPU Alumni Association. Their membership is coterminous with their respective terms, while the remaining two members are from the Private Sector who are prominent citizens of the Province of Laguna.

University President

The University is headed by the University President, appointed by the board, who has a renewable of a four-year term. Mario R. Briones, EdD, is the incumbent University President. Elected to office by the Board of Regents on March 21, 2019, Dr. Briones is the third President of the University, succeeding Dr. Ricardo A. Wagan (2007-2012) and Dr. Nestor M. De Vera (2012-2019) respectively.

Vision for the University

Furthering the university’s vision of being a center of sustainable development initiatives in transforming lives and communities, the President aims to have the potentials of the University for community and nation-building realized through its four-fold functions: Instruction, Research, Extension, and Production.

With its four campuses sealing ISO Certification 9001:2015 and its Sta. Cruz Main Campus delivered for Institutional Accreditation (IA), the University under President Briones’ administration shall deliver quality education in preparing its graduates not only for local and national workforce but also international labor landscape. As an industrial educator by the profession, the President would like to have the students of the University be equipped and be at par with others with the advent of the Fourth Industrial Revolution.

Background

Prior into becoming the University President, Dr. Briones assumed various administrative positions such as Director of Extension Services, Dean of the College of Computer Studies, Director of Resource Generation and Outsourcing, Chairperson of the Student Affairs and Services, Director of Safety Management Services, Deputy Campus Director, and Campus Director among others.

Apart from his learnings in the academe, President Briones further extended the breath and depth of his knowledge and expertise to perform the functions given to him by submitting himself to different seminars, workshops, and conferences locally, nationally, and internationally relative to his positions as an academician and administrator.

President Briones is a recipient of a number of recognitions conferred by the university such as the two Presidential Recognitions from the two former university presidents of LSPU, and other government agencies such as regional ABS-CBN Gawad Kalinga and academe-industry partners in Malaysia and Vietnam.

Courses 
The following lists are the academic programs offered by the university in the different colleges (source: LSPU Annual Report, 2019)

College of Teacher Education (CHED Center of Development in Teacher Education)

 Doctor of Philosophy in Education
 Doctor of Education (Major in Educational Management)
 Master of Arts in Education (Major in: Educational Management, Guidance and Counseling, English, Filipino, Mathematics, Physical Education, Science and Technology, Social Science, Technology and Livelihood Education)
 Bachelor of Secondary Education (Major in: English, Filipino, Mathematics, Science, Social Studies, Values Education)
 Bachelor of Physical Education
 Bachelor of Early Childhood Education
 Bachelor of Elementary Education
 Bachelor of Technology and Livelihood Education (Major in: Industrial Arts, Information and Communication Technology, Home Economics)
 Bachelor of Technical-Vocational Teacher Education (Major in: Architectural Drafting Technology, Electrical Technology, Electronics Technology, Food Service Management)
 Bachelor of Technical Teacher Education
 Certificate in Teaching Proficiency

College of Computer Studies  

 Master of Science in Information Technology
 Bachelor of Science in Information Technology
 Bachelor of Science in Computer Science
 Bachelor of Science in Information System
 Associate in Computer Technology

College of Fisheries

 Master of Science in Fisheries
 Bachelor of Science in Fisheries
 Bachelor of Science in Fisheries Business Management
 Bachelor of Science in Fishery Education

College of Agriculture

 Doctor of Philosophy in Agriculture
 Master of Science in Agriculture
 Master of Science in Agricultural Education
 Bachelor of Science in Agriculture (Major in: Animal Science, Crop Science, Organic Agriculture)
 Bachelor of Science in Agricultural Education
 Bachelor of Science in Agricultural Technology
 Bachelor of Science in Agribusiness

College of Business, Management and Accountancy

 Doctor of Public Administration
 Master of Public Administration
 Bachelor of Arts in Public Administration
 Bachelor of Science in Accountancy
 Bachelor of Science in Business Administration (Major in: Marketing Management, Financial Management)
 Bachelor of Science in Entrepreneurship
 Bachelor of Science in Business Administration
 Bachelor of Science in Office Administration

College of Hospitality Management and Tourism

 Bachelor of Science in Hospitality Management
 Bachelor of Science in Hotel and Restaurant Management
 Bachelor of Science in Tourism
 Bachelor of Science in Tourism Management
 Diploma in Hotel and Restaurant Management

College of Nursing

 Master of Science in Nursing
 Bachelor of Science in Nursing
 Diploma in Midwifery

College of Engineering

 Bachelor of Science in Agricultural Engineering
 Bachelor of Science in Agricultural and Biosystems Engineering
 Bachelor of Science in Civil Engineering
 Bachelor of Science in Computer Engineering
 Bachelor of Science in Electrical Engineering
 Bachelor of Science in Electronics Engineering
 Bachelor of Science in Mechanical Engineering

College of Arts and Sciences

 Bachelor of Arts in Broadcasting
 Bachelor of Science in Biology
 Bachelor of Science in Chemistry
 Bachelor of Science in Mathematics
 Bachelor of Science in Psychology
 Intensive English Language Proficiency

College of Criminal Justice Education

 Bachelor of Science in Criminology

College of Industrial Technology  

 Bachelor of Science in Industrial Technology  (Major in: Architectural Drafting Technology, Automotive Technology, Electrical Technology, Electronics Technology, Food Technology, Garments Technology, Refrigeration and Air-conditioning)
 Associate in Technology  

College of Food Nutrition and Dietetics

 Bachelor of Science in Nutrition and Dietetics  
 Bachelor of Science in Food Technology

Senior High School  

Academic Track  

 Accountancy Business and Management
 Humanities and Social Sciences
 Science, Technology, Engineering and Mathematics  

Technical-Vocational Livelihood Track  

 Agri-Fishery Arts
 Homes Economics
 Industrial Arts
 Information and Communication Technology

References

LSPU Five-Year Development Plan 2007-2012. Printed in 2007
LSPC Code (Revised Copy, 2004). Approved pursuant to Board Resolution No. 104, s. 1991 dated December 18, 1991 and further Confirmed through Board Resolution No. 9, s. 1992 dated May 19, 1992
LSPC Annual Report 2006. Printed in 2007
LSPU Student Handbook 2007, 2012 editions

External links
 

Universities and colleges in Laguna (province)
State universities and colleges in the Philippines
Education in Cabuyao